Principe di Carignano may refer to:

 Principe di Carignano, prince of House of Savoy-Carignano
 Principe di Carignano-class ironclad, group of three ironclad warships built for the Italian Regia Marina (Royal Navy) in the 1860s
 Italian ironclad Principe di Carignano, lead ship of the Principe di Carignano class of ironclad warships built for the Italian Regia Marina

See also

 Carignano (disambiguation)
 Palazzo Carignano
 Princess of Carignano